Emir Murati (born 7 March 2000) is an Italian-Croatian professional footballer who plays as a midfielder for 2. Liga Interregional club FC Balzers.

Club career

Milan
He is a product of AC Milan academy and started playing for their under-19 squad in the 2017–18 season.

Loan to Rende
On 29 August 2019 he joined Serie C club Rende on a season-long loan.

He made his professional Serie C debut for Rende on 29 September 2019 in a game against Potenza. He substituted Markus Soomets in the 57th minute.

Loan to Vibonese
On 30 January 2021, he was loaned to Vibonese.

References

External links
 

2000 births
Living people
Sportspeople from the Province of Bergamo
People from Calcinate
Footballers from Lombardy
Italian people of Croatian descent
Association football midfielders
Croatian footballers
Rende Calcio 1968 players
S.S.D. Pro Sesto players
U.S. Vibonese Calcio players
Serie C players